Three ships named Ceres, for Ceres, the Roman goddess of agriculture, served the British East India Company (EIC) as East Indiamen:

 was launched in 1773 and made four voyages before she was sold in 1784 as a hulk.
 was launched in 1787 and made three voyages before the British Royal Navy purchased her and renamed her HMS Grampus. Grampus stranded in 1799 in the Thames and had to be burnt.
 was launched in 1797 and made nine voyages for the EIC before she was sold in 1816 as a hulk.

In addition, one vessel named  performed two voyages for the EIC under charter. 

Ships of the British East India Company
Ship names